Elections to West Dunbartonshire Council were held on 3 May 2012 on the same day as the 31 other local authorities in Scotland. The election used the six wards created under the Local Governance (Scotland) Act 2004, with 22 Councillors being elected. Each ward elected either 3 or 4 members, using the STV electoral system.

The election saw the Scottish Labour Party gain 2 seats to secure an overall majority on the Council while also significantly increasing their vote. The Scottish National Party remained in second place on the Council but West Dunbartonshire proved to be their worst performance in Scotland as they lost 3 seats including that of their former Council leader, Ronnie McColl. Independents increased their seat numbers to 3 through the addition of former Labour Councillor and the Scottish Socialist Party retained their sole seat in Scotland.

Following the election the Labour majority administration was formed. This replaced the previous SNP minority led administration which had been supported by the Independents that had existed from 2007-2012.

Election result

Note: "Votes" are the first preference votes. The net gain/loss and percentage changes relate to the result of the previous Scottish local elections on 3 May 2007. This may differ from other published sources showing gain/loss relative to seats held at dissolution of Scotland's councils.

Ward results

Lomond
2007: 2xSNP; 1xLabour 
2012: 2xLab; 1xSNP
2007-2012 Change: Lab gain one seat from SNP
  

		

= Sitting Councillor for a different Ward.

Leven
2007: 2xSNP; 1xLab; 1xSSP  
2012: 2xLab; 1xSNP; 1xSSP
2007-2012 Change: Lab gain one seat from SNP

Dumbarton
2007: 2xLab; 1xSNP; 1xIndependent
2012: 2xLab; 1xSNP; 1xIndependent
2007-2012 Change: No change

Kilpatrick
2007: 2xLab; 1xSNP  
2012: 2xLab; 1xSNP
2007-2012 Change: No change

Clydebank Central
2007: 2xLab; 1xSNP; 1xIndependent  
2012: 2xLab; 1xSNP; 1xIndependent
2007-2012 Change: No change

Clydebank Waterfront
2007: 2xSNP; 2xLab  
2012: 2xLab; 1xSNP; 1xIndependent
2007-2012 Change: Independent gain one seat from SNP

Changes since 2012 election 
† On 5 January 2016, Marie McNair joined the Scottish National Party and ceased to be an independent.

References 

2012
2012 Scottish local elections
21st century in West Dunbartonshire